I Believe in You may refer to:

Film 
I Believe in You (film), a 1952 British film starring Celia Johnson

Music

Albums 
I Believe in You. Your Magic Is Real., a 2007 album by Yacht
I Believe in You (Dolly Parton album), 2017

Songs 
"I Believe in You" (Neil Young song), also covered by Linda Ronstadt, Rita Coolidge and others
"I Believe in You" (Don Williams song)
"I Believe in You" (Kylie Minogue song)
"I Believe in You" (Mel Tillis song)
"I Believe in You" (Nick Jonas song)
"I Believe in You" (Paul Haig song)
"I Believe in You" (Talk Talk song)
"I Believe in You" (Frank Loesser song), 1961
"I Believe in You (Je crois en toi)", a song by Celine Dion and II Divo, 2006
"I Believe in You (You Believe in Me)", a song by Johnnie Taylor, 1973
"I Believe in You", a song by Agnes Carlsson from the album Stronger, 2006
"I Believe in You", a song by Bob Dylan from the album Slow Train Coming, 1979
"I Believe in You", a song by Brother Beyond from the album Trust, 1989
"I Believe in You", a song by Frank Loesser from the musical How to Succeed in Business Without Really Trying, 1961
"I Believe in You", a song by Jay Sean from the album Me Against Myself, 2004
"I Believe in You", a song by No Angels from the album Destiny, 2007
"I Believe in You", a song by Percy Sledge from the album I'll Be Your Everything, 1974, composed by Phillip Mitchell
"I Believe in You", a song by Robin Zander from the album Robin Zander, 1993
"I Believe in You", a song by Stryper from the album In God We Trust, 1988
"I Believe in You", a song by Toy-Box from the album Fantastic, 1999
"I Believe in You", a song by Twisted Sister from the album Come Out and Play, 1984
"I Believe in You", a song by Y&T from the album Earthshaker, 1981
"I Believe in You", a song by Joe featuring NSYNC from the album My Name Is Joe, 2000
"I Believe in You", a song by Dolly Parton from I Believe in You, 2017
"I Believe in You", a song by Michael Bublé from Nobody but Me, 2017

Songs with similar titles
"I Don't Believe in You", a 1986 song by Talk Talk
"I Believe in U", a 2017 song by Ukrainian singer Jamala
"Believe in You", a song by Amanda Marshall from the album Tuesday's Child
"I Believe in You and Me", a song by The Four Tops, 1982, also covered by Whitney Houston
"I Believe You", a song by The Carpenters, 1978
"I Believe You", a song by Celldweller from the album Celldweller

See also 
I Still Believe in You (disambiguation)